Jaime Parés (born 18 July 1955) is a Spanish sports shooter. He competed in the men's 50 metre rifle prone event at the 1992 Summer Olympics.

References

External links
 

1955 births
Living people
Spanish male sport shooters
Olympic shooters of Spain
Shooters at the 1992 Summer Olympics
Sportspeople from Barcelona
20th-century Spanish people